Andrew Phung is a Canadian actor, improviser, and comedian. He played the character Kimchee Han on the CBC Television sitcom Kim's Convenience. For this role, he has been a five-time Canadian Screen Award winner for Best Supporting Actor in a Comedy Series.

Background 
Andrew Phung was born and raised in Calgary, Alberta, and attended Bishop McNally High School. Phung's father is of Vietnamese descent and his mother is Chinese. He joined the Loose Moose Theatre Company when he was 16 years old. As of 2020, he is a senior ensemble performer and instructor with the theatre. He studied economics at the University of Calgary and worked as a non-profit director before pursuing acting.

Career 
In 2008, he joined the comedy group Sciencebear. Together they created and produced various comedic shorts, and in 2009 they released the film Sketch, which was produced on a $100 budget. It was an official entry into the 2010 Calgary International Film Festival.

In 2009 Phung was named one of Calgary's Top 40 under 40 by Avenue Magazine. That year he was also a featured cast member on the television series Drafted on the Score Television Network.

Phung is the co-creator of the hit improvised comedy shows Past your Bedtime, Northeast: The Show, and Kill Hard.

From 2015 to 2016, he co-wrote and starred in two seasons of Cowtown, a sketch comedy series produced by Nur Films and Telus Optik.

From 2016-2021 Phung played the role of Kimchee in the CBC Television sitcom Kim's Convenience. He has won several Canadian Screen Awards for Canadian Screen Award for Best Supporting Actor in a Comedy Series, at the 5th Canadian Screen Awards in 2017, the 6th Canadian Screen Awards in 2018, and the 8th Canadian Screen Awards in 2020. In March of 2021 it was announced that despite being renewed to a 6th season, Kim's Convenience would be ending after five seasons due to the departure of the show runners.<ref>Jethro Nededog, "Korean family comedy Kim's Convenience canceled after 5 seasons". Entertainment Weekly, March 8, 2021.</ref>

Post-Kim's Convenience, Phung stars in the lead role on Run the Burbs for CBC; he also is a co-creator of the series.

Phung won two awards at the 9th Canadian Screen Awards in 2021, winning both his fourth award for Best Supporting Actor in a Comedy Series for Kim's Convenience'', and Best Host in a Web Program or Series for his role as host of the 2019 Canadian Improv Games.

Personal life 
In 2013, Phung married Tamara Sharpe. They have two sons together.

Phung is the co-founder of YYCSolediers, an online sneaker group which also produces Sneaker SWAP, a Calgary-based sneaker event. He is heavily involved in an organization called Youth Central, a non profit organization which helps youth get involved in their communities.

Filmography

Television

Film

References

External links

1980s births
Living people
Best Supporting Actor in a Comedy Series Canadian Screen Award winners
Canadian male actors of Chinese descent
Canadian male actors of Vietnamese descent
Canadian male stage actors
Canadian male television actors
Male actors from Calgary
University of Calgary alumni